is a railway station operated by JR West on the Sanyō Main Line in Tabuse, Kumage District, Yamaguchi, Japan.

Platforms

History 

September 25, 1897: Station opens as part of the newly built Hiroshima-Tokuyama segment of the Sanyō Railway
December 1, 1906: Station is transferred to Japanese Government Railways as a part of railway nationalization
April 1, 1987: Station operation is taken over by JR West after privatization of Japanese National Railways

See also
 List of railway stations in Japan

External links

  

Railway stations in Japan opened in 1897
Sanyō Main Line
Hiroshima City Network
Railway stations in Yamaguchi Prefecture
Tabuse, Yamaguchi